is 8-story office and TV studio building located in Roppongi, Minato, Tokyo, Japan. It houses the headquarters of TV Asahi. The building was designed by architect Fumihiko Maki. Construction was finished in 2003.

TV Asahi building is a part of Roppongi Hills, the main entrance atrium is open to visitors. The TV Asahi Building is next to the Mohri Garden.

References

Buildings and structures in Minato, Tokyo
High-tech architecture
TV Asahi
Office buildings completed in 2003
Roppongi
Mori Building